The 2012 FIBA World Olympic Qualifying Tournament for Women was a women's basketball tournament that consisted of 12 national teams, where the top five teams earned a place in the 2012 Olympics basketball tournament. It was held on 25 June – 1 July 2012 at the Ankara Arena in Ankara, Turkey.

Qualification

 Cuba renounced the right to compete in the World Olympic Qualifying Tournament for Women. In these circumstances, the FIBA has chosen Puerto Rico, the best team in the Americas Championship after Cuba.
 Senegal and Nigeria renounced the right to compete in the World Olympic Qualifying Tournament for Women. In these circumstances, the FIBA has chosen Mozambique, the best team in the African Championship after Senegal and Nigeria.

Format
The 12 teams were divided into four groups (Groups A–D) for the preliminary round. The top two teams from each group qualified for the knockout round. All four quarterfinal winners advanced to the Olympics, the four quarterfinal losers played two rounds to allocate the final slot.

Squads

Preliminary round

All times are local (UTC+3)

Group A

Group B

Group C

{{Basketballbox|time=14:30|bg=#eee|place=Ankara, Turkey|date=27 June
|report = Report
|teamA=
|teamB=
|scoreA= 75|scoreB=83
|Q1=19–16 |Q2=13–23 |Q3=19–19 |Q4=24–'25
|points1= Beon Yeon-Ha 19
|rebounds1= Sin Jung-Ja 13
|assist1= Choi Yoon-Ah 5
|points2= Vrsaljko 26
|rebounds2= Salopek, Vrsaljko 7
|assist2= four players 4
|referee= Naftal Candido Chongo (MOZ), Jose Martin (ESP), Heros Avanesian (IRI)
}}

Group D

Knockout stageNote: Italicized teams qualify for the Olympics.''

Quarterfinals

Semifinals

Final

Final standings

See also
 2012 FIBA World Olympic Qualifying Tournament for Men

References

External links
 Olympic Basketball Tournament Road to London 2012

FIBA World Olympic Qualifying Tournament for Women
International women's basketball competitions hosted by Turkey
qual
2012
2011–12 in Turkish basketball